A list of Australia national soccer team results:

 Australia national soccer team results (1922–1949)
 Australia national soccer team results (1950–1979)
 Australia national soccer team results (1980–1999)
 Australia national soccer team results (2000–2019)
 Australia national soccer team results (2020–present)
 2010 Australia national soccer team season
 2011 Australia national soccer team season
 2012 Australia national soccer team season
 2013 Australia national soccer team season
 2014 Australia national soccer team season
 2015 Australia national soccer team season
 2016 Australia national soccer team season
 2017 Australia national soccer team season
 2018 Australia national soccer team season
 2019 Australia national soccer team season